Kharkoo is a valley in Gilgit-Baltistan Pakistan). Kharkoo is in Ghanche

References

Populated places in Ghanche District
Valleys of Gilgit-Baltistan